Simon Willson (Aka DJ Simon) is a Hong Kong radio producer, freestyle club DJ and sometime actor.

Born in Bath, UK, he is the youngest son of record breaking former world 16m glider champion and renowned Combined Services and Hong Kong cricketer B.J. "Tug" Willson.

Raised in Hong Kong, Willson has been a part of the Asian dance scene since the early eighties when he span in Tramps Disco Central, which was possibly Hong Kong's first regular "party night" as, every Friday, the tables and chairs were removed from an Indonesian restaurant and it filled up with fellow expat teenagers. From 1984 through 1989 Willson acted in dozens of Hong Kong movies and TV productions starting off as an extra, working up through bit parts to supporting roles. He's best known as the vampire in Cinema City's production "Vampire's Breakfast"  which still features regularly on STAR TV Chinese Movie Channel.

By early 1989 Willson was the producer/presenter of "Night Music" 4 weekly late night radio shows on RTHK (Radio Television Hong Kong) Radio 3. This was cut short by a serious motor cycle accident he broke his jaw in four places, dislocated and damaged his knees and broke his right index finger.

In addition to hosting Just Dance and the Sunday after Noon Session (1-4pm) on RTHK Radio 3 Willson is the official DJ of Hong Kong Sevens

References

Year of birth missing (living people)
Living people
Hong Kong radio presenters